Aitabare or Aaitabare is a market village that is the center of Ward 7 of the Kanepokhari Rural Municipality of the Morang District in Province No. 1 of south-eastern Nepal. The population of Kanepokhari Ward 7 in 2011 was 4,241.

Location

Aitabare is in Nepal, Province 1, Morang, Kanepokhari
A satellite view shows Aitabare set in farmland bounded by forest to the north.
The Köppen climate classification is Cwa : Monsoon-influenced humid subtropical climate.

The Nepali word Aaitabar means "Sunday".
Aaitabare is a common Eastern Nepal town name that indicates the day of the weekly haat bazaar.
GeoNames lists 11 populated places with this name.

Population

The village is the center of Kanepokhari Ward 7, formerly Bayarban Ward 9.
In 2068 BS (2011 CE) the ward had 948 households with a total population of 4,241 of which 1,916 were male and 2,325 were female.

Facilities

Aitabare contains Jankalyan Secondary School.
This is part of the Panchayat Higher Secondary School Pathari.
As of 2071 BS (2014 CE) it had 14 pupils.
The village also has the Adarsha English School, an English medium school established in 2040 BS (1984 CE).

The Shiva Mandir Hindu temple is in the north of the village.
The Syarlo Tamu Kwoiwo Gurung monastery is in the Aaitabare market.

In August 2018 the Minister for Energy, Water Resource and Irrigation Barsaman Pun announced a 30-kilowatt capacity solar mini-grid project in Miklajung Rural Municipality-1 in Morang district and electrification of 75 houses in the Aitabare area that had not been connected to the grid.

Communications

The Itabare–Jahada road runs west from the village to Jahada, and the Aitabare–Sukrabare runs east from the village to Sukrabare.
If a February 2020 proposal for electrified railway alignment (Inaruwa–Kakarbhitta main line and Itahari–Biratnagar link line) is approved, Aitabare would be one of the settlements along the line, between Chalisbigha and Pachisbigha. Most of these settlements are clusters of houses with a small market.

Notes

References

External links

Kanepokhari Rural Municipality